"All Things Considered" is a song written by lead vocalist Tim Hunt and recorded by the American country music group Yankee Grey, which was released in June 1999 as the leadoff single from the group's first album, Untamed. The song reached #8 on the Billboard Hot Country Singles & Tracks chart.

Content
The song is an uptempo, that paints the picture of a man who is hanging on, despite relationship, automobile, and job related problems. He states that even though all of these negative things are occurring in his life, he is surviving.

Critical reception
Chuck Taylor, of Billboard magazine gave the song a favorable review, saying that the song "grabs the listener by the ears from the first word and doesn't let go till the final note."

Music video
The music video was directed by David Abbott.

Chart positions

Year-end charts

References

1999 debut singles
Yankee Grey songs
Song recordings produced by Josh Leo
Monument Records singles
1999 songs